Terva Leijona ("Tar Lion") is a Finnish liquorice candy with tar flavouring. The candy is produced by Cloetta.

It is available in traditional flavours like sugarless, licorice, and salmiakki. Leaf has also released a Villi Pohjola (Wild North) mix that contains some of more exotic flavours, such as juniper berry - lemon, cloudberry - licorice and lingonberry - havu (pine/spruce needles). The candy was invented by Y. W. Jalander.

Finnish confectionery
Brand name confectionery
Liquorice (confectionery)